Robert Koffler Jarvik (born May 11, 1946) is an American scientist, researcher and entrepreneur known for his role in developing the Jarvik-7 artificial heart.

Early life
Robert Jarvik was born in Midland, Michigan, to Norman Eugene Jarvik and Edythe Koffler Jarvik, and raised in Stamford, Connecticut. He is the brother to Jonathan Jarvik, a biological sciences professor at Carnegie Mellon University, as well as the nephew of Murray Jarvik, a pharmacologist who was the co-inventor of the nicotine patch.

Jarvik is a graduate of Syracuse University. He earned a master's degree in medical engineering from New York University.

After being admitted to the University of Utah School of Medicine, Jarvik completed two years of study, and in 1971 was hired by Willem Johan Kolff, a Dutch-born physician-inventor at the University of Utah, who produced the first dialysis machine, and who was working on other artificial organs, including a heart. Jarvik received his M.D. in 1976 from the University of Utah. Jarvik is a medical scientist, and did not complete an internship or residency and has never been licensed to practice medicine.

Career
Jarvik joined the University of Utah's artificial organs program in 1971, then headed by Willem Johan Kolff, his mentor. At the time, the program used a pneumatic artificial heart design by Clifford Kwan-Gett that had sustained an animal in the lab for 10 days. Kolff assigned Jarvik to design a new heart that would overcome the problems of the Kwan-Gett heart, eventually culminating with the Jarvik-7 device.

In 1982, the team carried out an artificial heart implant - the second ever, 13 years after Domingo Liotta and Denton Cooley's first in 1969. William DeVries first implanted the Jarvik-7 into retired dentist Barney Clark at the University of Utah on December 1, 1982. Clark required frequent visits to the hospital for the next 112 days, after which he died. During frequent press conferences to update the patient's condition, Jarvik, along with DeVries, briefed the world's media on Clark's condition. The next several implantations of the Jarvik-7 heart were conducted by Humana, a large health care insurance company. The second patient, William J. Schroeder, survived 620 days. In 1983, Jarvik and DeVries received the Golden Plate Award of the American Academy of Achievement.

In 2006, Jarvik began appearing in television commercials for Pfizer's cholesterol medication Lipitor. Two members of Congress, as part of their campaign against celebrity endorsements, began an investigation as to whether his television advertisements constitute medical advice given without a license to practice medicine. One commercial depicted Jarvik rowing, he did not row himself, and a body double was used. Later, Jarvik said that he had not taken Lipitor until becoming a spokesman for the company. On February 25, 2008, Pfizer announced that it would discontinue its ads with Jarvik.

Personal life
Jarvik has been married twice. He has a son and daughter with his first wife, Salt Lake City writer and journalist Elaine Jarvik.  In 2011 she and her daughter wrote the play,  A Man Enters, inspired by Jarvik's absent relationship with his children since their divorce.

Jarvik has been married to Parade magazine columnist Marilyn vos Savant since August 23, 1987.

Contrary to some sources, Jarvik is not a member of the Church of Jesus Christ of Latter-day Saints.

References

Inline citations

General references

External links
Jarvik Heart Official website.
Google Patents link to Winchell Patent for Artificial Heart
Pfizer Launches New Lipitor Effort
MSNBC article on Jarvik and Pfizer
Congress Probes Doctor's Role in Drug Ad 

1946 births
American inventors
Living people
People from Midland, Michigan
People from Stamford, Connecticut
Syracuse University alumni
Polytechnic Institute of New York University alumni
University of Utah School of Medicine alumni
Physicians from Michigan
Physicians from Connecticut
20th-century American physicians